Louise, Princess of Anhalt-Bernburg (née Princess Louise of Anhalt-Dessau; 21 August 1709 – 29 July 1732) was the first wife and consort of Victor Frederick, Prince of Anhalt-Bernburg.

Biography 
Princess Louise of Anhalt-Dessau was born in Dessau on 21 August 1709 to Leopold I, Prince of Anhalt-Dessau and Anna Louise Föhse. Prior to her birth, Louise's parents had been in a morganatic marriage until her mother, who was a commoner, was raised to the rank of imperial princess by Leopold I, Holy Roman Emperor in 1701. Since their marriage became dynastic, Louise was born as a princess of Anhalt-Dessau.

On 25 November 1724 Louise married Victor Frederick, Prince of Anhalt-Bernburg, becoming the Princess Consort of Anhalt-Bernburg. She gave birth to a daughter, Princess Sophie Louise, on 29 June 1732. Due to health complications after childbirth, she died on 19 July 1732 in Bernburg. She was buried in the crypt of the Castle Church of St. Aegidien.

References 

1709 births
1732 deaths
House of Ascania
Deaths in childbirth
Princesses of Anhalt-Dessau
Princesses of Anhalt-Bernburg
People from Dessau-Roßlau
Burials at Schlosskirche St. Aegidien (Bernburg)
Daughters of monarchs